Gollapalli Srinivas Ashok is an Indian politician of the Union Territory of Puducherry. He was elected to state legislative assembly from Yanam constituency as independent candidate during 2021 Puducherry Legislative Assembly election.

After winning the assembly elections as independent candidate, he pledged his support to the Bharatiya Janata Party in the Puducherry Legislative Assembly.

Family and educational background
Ashok is a son of Late Gollapalli Gangadhara Prathap, a BJP politician in Yanam during the late 1990s and early 2000s. His father contested unsuccessfully from Yanam in 2000 (By-election) and 2001 Puducherry Legislative Assembly election. Ashok pursued PG Diploma in Business Administration.

Elections contested and results

Thiru.N.Rangasamy has served as Puducherry Chief Minister three times. Gollapalli Srinivas Ashok won the election against Chief Minister. It is a record in Union Territory of Puducherry.

Titles held

See also
Yanam (Union Territory Assembly constituency)
2021 Puducherry Legislative Assembly election

References

People from Yanam
Puducherry politicians
Telugu politicians
Living people
1992 births
Puducherry MLAs 2021–2026
Bharatiya Janata Party politicians from Puducherry